WOHM may refer to:

 Wings of History Museum
 WOHM-LP, a low-power radio station (96.3 FM) licensed to serve Charleston, South Carolina, United States